General elections were held in Suriname on 29 March 1955. The result was a victory for the Unity Front, which won 11 of the 21 seats.

Results

Elected members
Unity Front
 Stuart Harry Axwijk (SDP)
 Clemens Ramkisoen Biswamitre (PSV)
 E.R. Braaf (SDP)
 Rudolf Bernhard William Comvalius (SDP)
 J.A. Emanuels (PSV)
 J.J. Emanuelson (PS)
 David George Findlay (SDP)
 George Kort (PS)
 Henny Lamur (PS)
 Henk van Ommeren (SDP)
 J.A. Wessels (PSV)

VHP
 Jagernath Lachmon
 Harry Radhakishun
 Harry Francois Sewberath Misser
 Soekdew Mungra
 Khemradj Kanhai
 Ramkisoen Dewdat Oedayrajsing Varma

NPS
 Emanuel Ferdinand Pierau
 Johan Kraag

KTPI
 Ashruf Karamat Ali
 Iding Soemita

References

Suriname
Elections in Suriname
1955 in Suriname
Suriname
Election and referendum articles with incomplete results